James Douglas Breckinridge (1781 – May 6, 1849) was a U.S. Representative from Kentucky. He was a member of the noted Breckinridge family.

Breckinridge was born in Woodville, Kentucky in 1781. He attended Washington College (now Washington and Lee University) in Lexington, Virginia, from 1800 to 1803, where he studied law. After completing his studies, he was admitted to the bar and opened a law practice in Louisville, Kentucky.

Breckinridge served as member of the Kentucky House of Representatives from 1809 to 1811. He was appointed judge by Governor Joseph Desha in April 1826, but declined to serve.

Breckinridge was elected as a Democratic-Republican to the 17th Congress to fill the vacancy caused by the death of United States Representative Wingfield Bullock (November 21, 1821 – March 3, 1823). His campaign in 1822, at the end of that term, for election in his own election to the 18th Congress was unsuccessful. Following his leaving Congress, he resumed the practice of law.

Breckinridge married Lucy Fry Speed, daughter of John Speed.

Breckinridge died in Louisville, Kentucky on May 6, 1849 and was interred in St. John's Cemetery. His remains were later re-interred in St. Louis Catholic Cemetery, Louisville in 1867.

References

1781 births
1849 deaths
People from Ballard County, Kentucky
Politicians from Louisville, Kentucky
Breckinridge family
Burials at St. Louis Cemetery, Louisville
Democratic-Republican Party members of the United States House of Representatives from Kentucky
19th-century American politicians